Castle of Illusion Starring Mickey Mouse is a 1990 platform game developed by Sega and released for the Mega Drive/Genesis. An 8-bit version of the game was later released for the Master System and Game Gear. The game follows Mickey Mouse on a quest to save Minnie Mouse from the evil witch Mizrabel. It is the first game in Sega's Illusion video game series starring Mickey.

Castle of Illusion was very well received by critics, especially the original 16-bit version. It was re-released in 1998 in Japan as part of Sega Ages: Mickey Mouse & Donald Duck for the Sega Saturn, which features both Castle of Illusion and QuackShot. A remake of the game by Sega Studios Australia was released for PlayStation Network, Xbox Live Arcade and Microsoft Windows in September 2013. The game was also included on the Sega Genesis Mini in 2019.

Plot
Castle of Illusion is a side-scrolling platformer in which the player takes control of Mickey Mouse as he goes inside the Castle of Illusion in order to rescue Minnie Mouse from an evil witch named Mizrabel, who wants to steal Minnie's youth and beauty. Upon meeting and conversing with the castle's true owner and king, Mickey is told that in order to defeat Mizrabel he must find the Seven Gems of the Rainbow. The majority of the seven gems are kept within various illusion-filled worlds (known in the game as levels) and are being guarded by Mizrabel's henchmen – which are known as the Masters of Illusion. Alongside the Masters of Illusion is Mizrabel's army. The army consists of bizarre creatures, such as enchanted mushrooms, toy soldiers, ball-juggling, unicycle-riding clowns, spiders, and armored knights. After thanking the castellan and hurrying into the castle hallway, Mickey begins to search through five doors that each leads to a different level. The levels are The Enchanted Forest, Toyland, The Storm, Dessert Factory, The Library, and finally, The Castle.

Gameplay

Mickey's main method of attack is to perform a 'bounce' whilst jumping, which can be used to defeat enemies or to bounce upwards towards higher areas. Mickey can collect projectiles such as apples and marbles to throw at his opponents. There are various items that earn bonus points, increase the player's health and grant extra tries.

Every level ends in a boss battle against each Master of Illusion (Mizrabel's henchmen) where Mickey can earn a gem, although the final two levels award a gem halfway through. After clearing all five levels, obtaining all gems will open up the route to the witch's tower. There, the player faces the final boss: a giant and youthful version of Mizrabel. There is an easy mode available where players play through truncated versions of the first three levels, with no boss fights.

The Master System and Game Gear versions of the game have different game mechanics, enemies, items, levels, and graphics.

Release
 
The game was included on a cartridge entitled Disney Collection, bundled with QuackShot, in 1996. An emulated version of Castle of Illusion was included in a bundle for those who preordered its remake on PSN; this bundle was offered again for PlayStation Plus subscribers in April 2014.

An 8-bit version of the game was released in 1991 for the Master System and Game Gear.

Reception

Mega Drive/Genesis
At the time of its release, Castle of Illusion received positive reviews. Mean Machines gave the Sega Mega Drive/Genesis version of the game a positive review, awarding it a score of 95% while specifically praising the game's graphics and playability. Console XS gave an overall score of 96% and praised the graphics, sound, gameplay and the dynamic gameplay. Mega Action gave a review score 90% and described the game as "A classic game with a massive playing area", they also praised the graphics and sound concluding: "We guarantee that you will be not disappointed". MegaTech opined the game is one of the best platform games on the MegaDrive and praised the game that it combines superlative graphics and excellent gameplay making Castle of Illusion addictive and an enjoyable challenge.

Entertainment Weekly picked the game as the #19 greatest game available in 1991, saying: "Perfect for younger players, but challenging enough to satisfy adults, too. A superbly animated Mickey bops through three different worlds—the Enchanted Forest, Toyland, and the Dessert Factory—in a quest to save Minnie from the evil witch Mizrabel".

Mega placed it at the 21st spot on their 1992 list of top Mega Drive games of all time.

According to GameSpot in 2010, "it wasn't just the levels that made this game so good. The music, the controls, and Mickey's superb animation all contributed to one of the very best Disney games that would heavily influence those to follow". In 2017, Gamesradar placed the game 35th on its "Best Sega Genesis/Mega Drive games of all time".

Master System/Game Gear

The Master System version also received positive reviews. Sega Power magazine in 1991 rated it the best Master System game of all time.

ACE called the Game Gear version "basically an unadulterated Mario clone—and not a bad one at that", giving it a score of eight out of ten. Console XS called the Castle of Illusion one of best games on the Master System writing: "Brilliant animation and sprite definition make this a joy to watch".  They also praised the game gear version saying it’s the best version of the game since it contains most of the levels from the other versions and Mickey looking superb because of the shrunken graphics.

Legacy

A sequel, Land of Illusion Starring Mickey Mouse, was released for the Master System in 1992 and for the Game Gear in 1993. World of Illusion Starring Mickey Mouse and Donald Duck followed for the Mega Drive/Genesis in 1992. In 1994, Legend of Illusion Starring Mickey Mouse was released for the Game Gear, with a Master System port following in 1998 in Brazil.

Epic Mickey: Power of Illusion, developed by DreamRift, was released in November 2012 for the Nintendo 3DS and serves as a spiritual successor to Castle of Illusion. In it, Mizrabel from Castle of Illusion returns as the main villain, but redesigned to resemble Maleficent.

Remake

A remake of the game, developed by Sega Studios Australia, was released for the PlayStation Network, Xbox Live Arcade and PC in September 2013. The game features 2.5D gameplay with 3D graphics and was developed under the supervision of the original game's director, Emiko Yamamoto, with a reimagined soundtrack by Grant Kirkhope. The original game was made available as a pre-order bonus for the PSN version.

See also
List of Disney video games

Notes

References

External links
Official app website

1990 video games
Disney video games
Game Gear games
Mickey Mouse video games
Platform games
Master System games
Sega Genesis games
Sega Saturn games
Sega video games
Video games about witchcraft
Video games set in castles
Side-scrolling platform games
Video games developed in Japan